Bristol station (locally known as Union Station and Bristol Train Station) is a historic railroad station in Bristol, Virginia, USA, just north of the Tennessee state line. Built in 1902, the station was served by passenger trains until 1971. It was listed on the National Register of Historic Places as Bristol Railroad Station in 1980.

History

Rail service first reached Bristol in 1856. A new station was built in 1902 by the Norfolk and Western Railway at a cost of $79,000. It is a one- to two-story brick building consisting of a tower section; a long seven-bay, one-story midsection; and a six-bay, two-story east end. The tower has a hipped roof with deep overhanging eaves supported by long sawn brackets. Stylistically, the station fits into the pattern of early 20th-century American eclecticism, combining Romanesque with various European vernacular modes. Associated with the station is a brick freight house constructed in 1883 and expanded in 1891.

Named trains and end of service
Several N&W trains served the station into the late 1960s:
Birmingham Special—New York City to Birmingham, and branch to Memphis
Pelican—New York to New Orleans
Tennessean—Washington to Memphis

Passenger service to Bristol station ended with the discontinuance of the Birmingham Special on April 30, 1971, when Amtrak assumed control for intercity passenger service in the United States. The station was listed on the National Register of Historic Places in 1980 as the Bristol Railroad Station. Around 2017, with Amtrak extending one daily Northeast Regional round trip to Roanoke, Bristol officials began advocating for a further extension to Bristol.

References

External links

History of the Bristol Train station
Bristol Train Station

Buildings and structures in Bristol, Virginia
National Register of Historic Places in Bristol, Virginia
Railway stations on the National Register of Historic Places in Virginia
Railway stations in the United States opened in 1902
Transportation in Bristol, Virginia
1902 establishments in Virginia
Norfolk and Western Railway stations